David Joel Trachtenberg is an American national security advisor who served as principal deputy under secretary for policy in the United States Department of Defense. He was previously the head of U.S. national security consulting firm Shortwaver. On March 17, 2017, he was announced as President Donald Trump's nominee to become principal deputy under secretary for policy in the Department of Defense. This nomination was confirmed by a 79–17 vote of the U.S. Senate on October 17, 2017.

Trachtenberg previously served as vice president and head of the strategic analysis division of CACI International Inc., the principal deputy assistant secretary of defense for international security policy at the U.S. Department of Defense, and as a senior staff member on the United States House Committee on Armed Services.

In mid-July 2019, it was announced that Trachtenburg would resign on July 19, 2019.

References

External links

Living people
University of Southern California alumni
Walsh School of Foreign Service alumni
Trump administration personnel
United States Department of Defense officials
Year of birth missing (living people)